Go Girl may refer to:
Go Girl (Ciara song), 2008 promo song by Ciara
Go Girl (Pitbull song), 2007 song by Pitbull
Go Girls, a New Zealand television production